The 1990 European Wrestling Championships were held in Poznan 1 – 8 May 1990.

Medal table

Medal summary

Men's freestyle

Men's Greco-Roman

References

External links
Fila's official championship website

Europe
W
European Wrestling Championships
Euro
1990 in European sport